Lawn bowls at the 1991 South Pacific Games was held from 7 to 21 September 1991 in Port Moresby and Lae, Papua New Guinea.

Men's results

Women's results

See also
 Lawn bowls at the Pacific Games

References

Lawn bowls at the Pacific Games